Hypostomus nudiventris is a species of catfish in the family Loricariidae. It is native to South America, where it occurs in coastal drainage basins of northern Brazil. The species reaches  in standard length and is believed to be a facultative air-breather.

References 

nudiventris
Fish described in 1941
Fish of Brazil
Catfish of South America